Malahide Community School (MCS) is a co-educational secondary school located in Malahide, County Dublin, Ireland. It accepts pupils of all religious denominations. The school grew from 512 students in 1976 to 1200 students by 2006, and remained at around 1200 as of 2018.

History

Foundation
In the early 1950s, Catherine Dowling set up the Stella Maris School in Malahide village. In 1958, the Infant Jesus Sisters founded Scoil Íosa, a junior and secondary school for girls on what are now the grounds of Malahide Community School. The two schools were amalgamated.

In 1976, the school joined the community school system which meant that it was no longer private, and became Pobalscoil Íosa. The school population at that time was just over 500. A new building, now known as the Junior Block, was added, followed shortly afterward by a sports hall.

New building
A three-storey school building, planned in 2005 for a November 2006 opening, was affected by multiple delays, and finally opened in February 2007. The first part of the demolition was started in March 2006, and was completed before the Leaving Certificate that took place in early June. The grand opening of the new building took place on 5 October with the Minister for Education and Science, Mary Hanafin. Over the summer of 2008, the canteen facility was planned to be operational and in use for the new school year, and was actually working by the latter half of that year. The school had, by then, over 1100 pupils.

Alumni

 Aodhán Ó Ríordáin, Labour Party TD
 Martin Fraser, Secretary General of the Department of the Taoiseach and Ambassador of Ireland to the United Kingdom
 Mark Little, RTÉ News correspondent and businessman
 Sharon Ní Bheoláin, RTÉ news presenter
 Domhnall Gleeson, actor
 Brian Gleeson, actor
 Niamh McEvoy, Dublin senior ladies' footballer and Australian Rules footballer
 Sinéad Aherne, Dublin senior ladies' footballer
 Gabrielle Reidy, actress
 Conor Sammon, footballer for the Republic of Ireland national football team
 Rene Gilmartin, Premier League footballer for Watford FC
 Dinny Corcoran, League of Ireland footballer
 Susan Loughnane, model and actress
 Director (band), rock group

References

External links
 

Educational institutions established in 1958
Malahide
Secondary schools in Fingal
Community schools in the Republic of Ireland
1958 establishments in Ireland